KZYS-LP is a low-power broadcast radio station licensed to Saint Cloud, Minnesota, serving Saint Cloud and Sauk Rapids in Minnesota.
The station signed on the air in August 2015, from a tower shared with KVEX-LP on the campus of St. Cloud State University.
The station airs an ethnic radio format, primarily Music of Somalia.

References

External links
 

2015 establishments in Minnesota
African culture in Minnesota
Radio stations established in 2015
Radio stations in Minnesota
Stearns County, Minnesota
Low-power FM radio stations in Minnesota
Somali-American history